The rain beetles are a group of beetles whose extant species are found only in the far west of North America. They spend most of their lives underground, emerging in response to rain or snow, thus the common name. Formerly classified in the Scarabaeidae (and later the Geotrupidae), they are currently assigned to their own family Pleocomidae, considered the sister group to all the remaining families of Scarabaeoidea. The family contains a single extant genus, Pleocoma, and two extinct genera, Cretocoma, described in 2002 from Late Cretaceous deposits in Mongolia, and Proteroscarabeus of Late Cretaceous China.

Extant members of Pleocoma are known from extreme southern Washington, throughout the mountains of Oregon and California, and into the extreme north of Baja California.

References

External links

Scarabaeiformia